"Let It Die" is a song by English singer-songwriter Ellie Goulding, released on 19 October 2022 through Polydor Records, as the third single from her fifth studio album, Higher Than Heaven (2023). It was written by Goulding, Tom Mann, Andrea Rocha, and Lostboy, and produced by the latter. This is the second song by Ellie Goulding with the same title; the first "Let It Die" is a bonus track from Goulding's third studio album Delirium (2015).

Background 
“Let It Die” is a song by singer-songwriter Ellie Goulding for her upcoming fifth studio album, Higher Than Heaven. It's the album third single and the first with Goulding as the only main artist credited, with the first two being "Easy Lover" featuring Big Sean, and "All by Myself" with Alok and Sigala. She first teased the song through a TikTok snippet back on October 14, 2022.

Speaking about the song to Genius, Goulding said: "Let it Die happened in a day with Tom Mann and LostBoy. I love working with them because we're all on the same page with our love of pop & electronic music but still wanting to have a deeper meaning in the theme and lyrics.

Pete [Lostboy] played us a beat and Tom & I seemed to know pretty quickly how the melody should go, and lyrically I knew it needed to be something dark & empowering at the same time. Letting go of a toxic relationship is hard so sometimes you just have to cut the cord and drive away, instead of stringing it out for the hurt to build & build. I don’t know anyone who hasn't been in this situation or doesn’t know someone who has."

Music video 
A music video for "Let It Die" was released the same day as the song worldwide, to her Vevo channel on YouTube. The music video was directed by Carlota Guerrero, and features Goulding in the White Cube Art Gallery, interacting with several dancers. One of the art pieces that is featured in the video is the painting "Chamber" by the artist Danica Lundy. The video received an age restriction from YouTube on its day of release, this came after the singer shows a nipple in the video. As 11 January 2023, the video has over 800k views.

Live performances 
"Let It Die" got its television debut performance on The Jonathan Ross Show on 5 November 2022, on which Goulding served as the musical guest. Later on that month she would end up performing the song at the festival, Hits Live 2023 by Hits Radio.

Credits and personnel 
Credits adapted from Spotify.

 Ellie Goulding –  songwriting, vocals
 LOSTBOY –  songwriting, production, bass, drum programmer, mixing engineer, keyboards, programmer
 Tom Mann – songwriting
 Andrea Rocha – songwriting
 Randy Merrill – mastering engineer

Charts

References

2022 songs
2022 singles
Ellie Goulding songs
Songs written by Ellie Goulding